The 1915 North Carolina Tar Heels football team was an American football team that represented the University of North Carolina in the 1915 college football season. The team compiled a 4–3–1 record and outscored its opponents by a combined total of 105 to 98.

Schedule

References

North Carolina
North Carolina Tar Heels football seasons
North Carolina Tar Heels football